The 18th Asian Table Tennis Championships 2007 were held in Yangzhou, China, from 17 to 23 September 2007. It was organised by the Chinese Table Tennis Association under the authority of Asian Table Tennis Union (ATTU) and International Table Tennis Federation (ITTF).

Medal summary

Medal table

Events

References

Asian Table Tennis Championships
Asian Table Tennis Championships
Table Tennis Championships
Table tennis competitions in China
Asian Table Tennis Championships
Asian Table Tennis Championships